At least two ships of the French Navy have been named Georges Leygues:

 , a  launched in 1936 and scrapped in 1959
 , a  launched in 1976 and decommissioned in 2014

French Navy ship names